Nyesville, also known as Nowlington, is an unincorporated community in Washington Township, Parke County, in the U.S. state of Indiana.

History
Nyesville had it start as a coal town. It was platted in 1871. A post office was established at Nyesville in 1872, and remained in operation until 1902.

Geography

Notable people
Mordecai Brown, former Chicago Cubs pitcher and a member of the Baseball Hall of Fame, was born in Nyesville.
Oscar R. Cauldwell, decorated United States Marine Corps Major general during World War II.

References

Unincorporated communities in Indiana
Unincorporated communities in Parke County, Indiana